Sedin Alić (born 31 May 1989 in Heijlsminde) is a Bosnian-Herzegovinian professional footballer.

Club career
The Danish-born Alić began his career with Christiansfeld IF and joined in July 2006 to the youth side of SønderjyskE. After one year in the a-youth of SønderjyskE signed his first professional contract for the club and played until December 2009 only 16 games. On 21 January 2010 signed a two and a half years contract for Vejle Boldklub.

References

External links
 Career stats - Elite Football

1989 births
Living people
People from Kolding Municipality
Danish people of Bosnia and Herzegovina descent
Association football midfielders
Danish men's footballers
Bosnia and Herzegovina footballers
SønderjyskE Fodbold players
Vejle Boldklub players
Vejle Boldklub Kolding players
Danish Superliga players
Danish 1st Division players
Ettan Fotboll players
Danish expatriate men's footballers
Expatriate footballers in Sweden
Danish expatriate sportspeople in Sweden
Sportspeople from the Region of Southern Denmark